St Andrew's Church is a 13th-century church in Bramfield, Suffolk. It has a separate 12th-century tower standing in the church grounds. It is one of 38 existing round-tower churches in Suffolk and the only detached example in the county. The ground before the altar of the church is paved with a number of fine ledger slabs of members of the Rabett and Nelson families.

Both the church and the tower are Grade I listed buildings.

References

External links 

St Andrews Church official Website
St Andrew's church in Bramfield
Website with photos of Bramfield St Andrew, a round-tower church

Grade I listed churches in Suffolk
Church of England church buildings in Suffolk
Round towers